XHCBR-FM is a radio station in Caborca, Sonora. Broadcasting on 100.1 FM, XHCBR is owned by Grupo Radio Palacios and branded as Max101 with a pop format.

History
XHCBR received its concession on August 16, 1994. It was owned by José Emilio López Silva, general manager of Grupo ACIR. In 2006, control of the station passed to Grupo Radio Palacios.

References

Radio stations in Sonora